The 2019 Malaysia Cup (Malay: Piala Malaysia 2019) was the 93rd edition of Malaysia Cup tournament organised by Football Association of Malaysia (FAM) and Malaysian Football League (MFL).

The 2019 Malaysia Cup began on August with a preliminary round. A total of 16 teams took part in the competition. The teams were divided into four groups, each containing four teams. The group leaders and runners-up teams in the groups after six matches qualified to the quarterfinals. 

Perak were the defending champions. They were eliminated by Selangor in the quarter-finals.

Format 
In the competition, the top eleven teams from the 2019 Malaysia Super League were joined by the top five teams from the 2019 Malaysia Premier League. The teams were drawn into four groups of four teams.

Round and draw dates 
The draw for the 2019 Malaysia Cup will be held on 23 July 2019.

Seeding

Group stage

Group A

Group B

Group C

Group D

Bracket

Knockout stage
The first legs was played in September 2019, and the second legs will be played in October 2019.

}

|}

Quarter-finals 

Johor Darul Ta'zim  won 5−1 on aggregate. 

Kedah won 6−2 on aggregate. 

Pahang won 6−1 on aggregate. 

Selangor won 3−2 on aggregate.

Semi-finals 
The first legs will be played on 19 October 2019, and the second legs will be played on 26 October 2019.

|}

8−8 on aggregate. Kedah won on away goals.

Johor Darul Ta'zim  won 5−1 on aggregate.

Final 

The final was played on 2 November 2019.

Statistics

Goalscorers 

Players sorted first by goals, then by last name.

Hat-tricks

Clean sheets 

Players sorted first by clean sheets, then by last name.

Winners

See also
2019 Malaysia FA Cup
2019 Malaysia Challenge Cup

References

External links
Malaysian Football League Official Website - (Malaysia Cup)

2019 in Malaysian football
Malaysia Cup seasons
Malaysia Cup